Botsina (also, buzina, botzina, and botsitsa) means lantern, lamp, torch, or spark in Aramaic.  Many times the reference, in Jewish sources, is to that which enlightens spiritually.

Mystical interpretations in Judaism
It was described in early Lurianic texts as an "explosion within thought".

Pinchas Giller, in Reading the Zohar: the sacred text of the Kabbalah (Oxford University Press, 2001), devotes a section to the phrase, calling it "the boldest image of the Hormanuta literature".  John Tindall Harris and William Robert Brown wrote in The writings of the Apostle John: with notes, critical and expository (1889) that "our lord used words that could not fail to be understood by the people, for among the Jews any one distinguished for light and erudition was termed in Aramaic ... bostina, a lamp or torch (Ber. Rab. 95.4).  Chrystosom observes, He called John a torch or lamp, signifying that he had not light of himself but by the grace of the Spirit."  Yehuda Liebes, in Studies in Jewish myth and Jewish messianism (SUNY Press, 1993), wrote that "ambiguities of meaning are typical in the Zohar, and the word bostina (spark) illustrates this well".

As a descriptive term for Torah sages
Rabbi Shimon Bar Yochai, the author of the Zohar (the prime of Jewish esoteric works), is referred to as Botsina Kadisha ("[The] Holy Lantern"). The Arizal, Rabbi Itzhak Luria, was also referred to as Botsina Kadisha in the books of his disciple Rabbi Chaim Vital. He lived about 500 years ago in Tzfat, Israel. The alter Rebbe of the Chabad movement is referred to as Botsina Kadisha in the opening of his book Likutei Torah. He lived a few hundred years ago and he is the author of the Chabad book called The Tanya or Sefer Beinonim.

See also
 Kabbalah

References

Aramaic words and phrases
Kabbalah
Kabbalistic words and phrases
Aramaic words and phrases in Jewish prayers and blessings